Cec Rheinberger (born 24 February 1949) is a former Australian rules footballer who played for Fitzroy in the Victorian Football League (VFL).

Rheinberger made just one appearance in the 1966 VFL season when he debuted along with Alex Ruscuklic mid year, against Melbourne. He played 15 games the following season but from then on spent most of his time in the reserves.

Later, in 1974, Rheinberger was a Wander Medallist in the North West Football Union, while playing with Devonport.

References

Holmesby, Russell and Main, Jim (2007). The Encyclopedia of AFL Footballers. 7th ed. Melbourne: Bas Publishing.

1949 births
Living people
Fitzroy Football Club players
Devonport Football Club players
Yarrawonga Football Club players
Australian rules footballers from Victoria (Australia)